The Zytek GL458 engine is a 4.5-litre, normally-aspirated, DOHC, V8 racing engine, developed and produced by Gibson for sports car racing, since 2018.

References

Engines by model
Gasoline engines by model
Zytek engines
V8 engines